Matías Cristóbal Parada Parra (born 2 April 1998) is a Chilean footballer who currently plays for Segunda División de Chile club Independiente de Cauquenes as a midfielder.

Career statistics

Club

External links
 

Living people
1998 births
Chilean footballers
Universidad de Chile footballers
Association football midfielders
People from Chillán